The National Collegiate Athletic Association (Philippines) beach volleyball tournament is held in March, the beginning of the dry season in the Philippines.

Champions

Number of championships by school

Individual awards

Most Valuable Player

See also
NCAA Volleyball Championship (Philippines)
UAAP Beach Volleyball Championship

References

Champions list at the official NCAA Philippines website
Presidents and hosts list at the official NCAA Philippines website

Beach Volleyball
Beach volleyball competitions
College men's volleyball tournaments in the Philippines
College women's volleyball tournaments in the Philippines